The National Strategy for Victory in Iraq is a document by the United States National Security Council which articulated the strategy of the United States President, in 2003, and provided an update on progress in various challenges and conflicts, notably Iraq.

On February 26, 2003, President George W. Bush stated,

  (italics in original)

Stages 
Short term
Iraq needs to 
 progress in fighting terrorists
 meet political milestones
 build democratic institutions
 foster the growing security forces.
Medium term
Iraq is in the lead 
 defeating terrorists
 providing its own security
 fostering the constitutional government
 beginning economic development
Longer term
Iraq should strive for being
 peaceful
 united
 stable
 secure 
 integrated into the international community
 a full partner in the global War on Terrorism.

See also 
 Reconstruction of Iraq

External links 
 "National Strategy for Victory in Iraq: Helping the Iraqi People Defeat the Terrorists and Build an Inclusive Democratic State". Also in PDF.

Iraq War